Alexander Fletcher or Alex Fletcher may refer to:

 Alexander Fletcher (British politician) (1929–1989), known as Sir Alex Fletcher, Conservative Member of Parliament (MP) in the UK
 Alexander Fletcher (colonial politician), Canadian politician
 Alexander Fletcher (minister) (1787–1860), British preacher, author of devotional works and children's religious education
 Alex Fletcher (actress), British actress
 Alex Fletcher (footballer), a striker for Bath City 
 Alex Fletcher, a character played by Hugh Grant in the 2007 film Music and Lyrics